Miss America 1941, the 15th Miss America pageant, was held at the Boardwalk Hall in Atlantic City, New Jersey on September 6, 1941. Shortly after the crowning of Miss California, Rosemary LaPlanche, who had been first runner-up in 1940, the pageant committee adopted this rule: "No contestant can compete in Atlantic City for the title of Miss America more than once", thus eliminating future state winners with more than one attempt at the national title.

LaPlanche became a film actress, as did her sister, Louise LaPlanche.

1941 was also the first year that the special award, “Miss Congeniality” was created. It went to Mifaunwy Shunatona, a member of the Otoe and Pawnee tribes — she was also the first American Indian contestant in the pageant’s history.

Results

Awards

Preliminary awards

Other awards

Contestants

References

Secondary sources

External links
 Miss America official website

1941
1941 in the United States
1941 in New Jersey
September 1941 events
Events in Atlantic City, New Jersey